Sonning Cutting is on the original Great Western Railway built by Isambard Kingdom Brunel. It is to the east of Reading station and to the west of Twyford station near the village of Sonning in Berkshire, England. The railway's originally planned route had been around the north of Sonning Hill past the village.

The cutting was hand-dug with no machinery and the spoil removed in wheelbarrows and horse-drawn carts. It took two years to complete and several people were killed in the process. The line was opened on 30 March 1840.

After the ending of the broad gauge in 1892 the railway was widened to four tracks. This involved a major rebuilding of the cutting, during which the slope of the sides was reduced.

Accident 

Early on 24 December 1841, a mixed goods and passenger train ran into a landslide in the cutting, caused by earlier persistent heavy rain. Many passengers who were carried in open-topped wagons were thrown out or crushed between the wagons. Eight people died there and seventeen, one of whom died later, were injured. Among the casualties were artisans returning home after working on the new Parliament building. The tragedy stimulated William Ewart Gladstone, while President of the Board of Trade (1843–1845), to introduce legislation to improve safety on the railways.

See also 
 Pre-1900 rail accidents in the UK
 List of British rail accidents by death toll, fewer than 10 killed

References 

Rail transport in Berkshire
Geography of Berkshire
Tourist attractions in Berkshire
Cutting
Great Western Railway
Works of Isambard Kingdom Brunel
Railway cuttings in the United Kingdom